Char Samuelson (born 1945) is a former Republican member of the Minnesota House of Representatives, serving from 2003–2007. She was elected from Minnesota 50B, which during her tenure in office served New Brighton, Arden Hills, and Shoreview. She was succeeded by Kate Knuth upon her retirement.

Samuelson first was elected to public office in 1994, when she was elected to the New Brighton City Council. She served on the City Council until 2002, when she ran for the House and defeated Geri Evans. Samuelson served two terms in the House, defeating Evans again in the 2004 election, and served on several committees relating to health care. Samuelson worked in health care before seeking public office. She received her bachelor's degree from Metropolitan State University and her master's from United Theological Seminary.

In 2009, Samuelson came out of retirement to run for re-election to the New Brighton City Council. She was elected to a two-year term.

Electoral history
2004 Race for Minnesota State House - District 50B
Char Samuelson (Republican) 10,843 (51.91%)
Geri Evans (Democratic-Farmer-Labor) 10,019 votes (47.96%)
2002 Race for Minnesota State House - District 50B
Char Samuelson (Republican) 10,027 (55.23%)
Geri Evans (Democratic-Farmer-Labor) 8,099 votes (44.61%)

References

External links

Minnesota city council members
Republican Party members of the Minnesota House of Representatives
1945 births
Living people
Women state legislators in Minnesota
People from New Brighton, Minnesota
Metropolitan State University alumni
United Theological Seminary alumni
Women city councillors in Minnesota
21st-century American politicians
21st-century American women politicians
20th-century American politicians
20th-century American women politicians